Brasuter is a surname. Notable people with the surname include:

Henry Brasuter, English politician
John Brasuter, MP for Dartmouth (UK Parliament constituency)